Franco "Frank" Nsubuga (born 28 August 1980 in Uganda) is a Ugandan cricketer. A right-handed batsman and off spin bowler, he has played for the Uganda national cricket team since 2001. His matches include seven first-class matches and fifty-two List A matches.

Playing career

Nsubuga made his international debut playing for East and Central Africa in the 1997 ICC Trophy when aged just 16. He played for Uganda in the 2001 tournament. His first-class debut came in April 2004 against Namibia in the ICC Intercontinental Cup. Uganda won the match, with Nsubuga being named man of the match. He also played against Kenya later in the year. He again played against Kenya and Namibia in the 2005 ICC Intercontinental Cup. He made his List A debut in 2005, representing Uganda at the 2005 ICC Trophy.

He has continued to play in the Ugandan team and represented them in Division Three of the World Cricket League in Darwin, Australia in 2007. Uganda won the tournament, with Nsubuga being named man of the match in the final against Argentina after scoring 55 from 38 balls and taking 4/27.

In April 2018, he was named in Uganda's squad for the 2018 ICC World Cricket League Division Four tournament in Malaysia. In July 2018, he was part of Uganda's squad in the Eastern sub region group for the 2018–19 ICC World Twenty20 Africa Qualifier tournament.

In September 2018, he was named in Uganda's squad for the 2018 Africa T20 Cup. The following month, he was named in Uganda's squad for the 2018 ICC World Cricket League Division Three tournament in Oman.

In May 2019, he was named in Uganda's squad for the Regional Finals of the 2018–19 ICC T20 World Cup Africa Qualifier tournament in Uganda. He made his Twenty20 International (T20I) debut for Uganda against Botswana on 20 May 2019. In July 2019, he was one of twenty-five players named in the Ugandan training squad, ahead of the Cricket World Cup Challenge League fixtures in Hong Kong. In November 2019, he was named in Uganda's squad for the Cricket World Cup Challenge League B tournament in Oman.

In November 2021, he was named in Uganda's squad for the Regional Final of the 2021 ICC Men's T20 World Cup Africa Qualifier tournament in Rwanda. In May 2022, he was named in Uganda's side for the 2022 Uganda Cricket World Cup Challenge League B tournament.

References

1980 births
Living people
Ugandan cricketers
Uganda Twenty20 International cricketers
East and Central Africa cricketers